Frederick Hendschel (August 9, 1879 – February 14, 1916) was a German-born American competition swimmer who represented the United States at the 1900 Summer Olympics in Paris. Hendschel competed in the semifinals of the men's 200-meter freestyle and the men's 200-meter obstacle course.

Publications
Fred Hendschel "Ribbon Clasp" US Patent D41359; Filing date: December 3, 1910; Issue date: May 9, 1911.

References

External links
 

1879 births
1916 deaths
American male freestyle swimmers
German emigrants to the United States
Olympic swimmers of the United States
Swimmers at the 1900 Summer Olympics
People from Rosenheim